The Salzburg trolleybus system forms part of the public transport network serving Salzburg, capital of the federal state of Salzburg in Austria.

One of only two such systems currently operating in Austria, the Salzburg trolleybus system is one of the largest trolleybus systems in western Europe. It presently carries 41 million passengers each year.

History
On 1 October 1940, the first trolleybus ran through the streets of Salzburg, on the Siegmundsplatz–Maxglan route, which is now part of line 1. A few days later, on 24 October 1940, the extension to Makartplatz followed, and on 10 November 1940, the line was further extended, to Salzburg Hauptbahnhof. On 16 February 1942, the ring lines M and L (Maxglan–Lehen–Hauptbahnhof–Zentrum–Maxglan) came into operation.  In the following years, the Salzburg trolleybus system recorded rapid growth, but the tramway network was destroyed.

Until the merger in 2000 of the Salzburger Stadtwerke with the SAFE (Salzburger AG für Energiewirtschaft) to create the Salzburg AG, the Salzburg trolleybus system, and the local railway line to Lamprechtshausen, were operated by the Salzburger Stadtwerke - Verkehrsbetriebe. Some diesel bus lines also originally belonged to the company, but in the course of the 2000 merger these were transferred to Albus Salzburg.

Since 2000, therefore, the trolleybus and diesel bus services have been fully separated, both organisationally and operationally. It follows that Salzburg AG is one of the few transport companies worldwide that operates trolleybus lines, but no diesel bus lines.

Unusually, however, the new terminal was served only during events. At other times, power to the overhead lines in this area is switched off; the status of the overhead lines is displayed to the trolleybus drivers by means of a signal light.

On 1 October 2005, line 1 was extended from Europark to Kavaliershaus, via the EM-Stadion. On 11 December 2005, the extension of line 2 came into operation from the Hauptbahnhof to Obergnigl via Mirabellplatz and the Sterneckstraße.

A  of overhead line from the Versorgungshausstraße (line 2) via the Fürbergstraße to the Fadingerstraße was built in the spring of 2006.  Especially during events in the city centre, and during the UCI Road World Championships 2006, it has been used intensively. Since then, the trolleybuses of lines 2 and 4 have operated on and off over this route. This section was the basis for the later electrification of the former Albus line 20.

Also, until September 2006 the Gaswerkgasse / Ignaz-Harrer-Strasse intersection, and the Hauptbahnhof area around the Forum-Kaufhaus/Fanny-von-Lehnert-Straße, were provided with additional turning and reversing capabilities. Likewise, since the spring of 2007 a non-revenue section has been in operation from the Landeskrankenhaus (line 7) to Willibald-Hauthaler-Straße (Line 4), and an additional turning space has been provided at the Makartplatz, in front of the Holy Trinity Church. A new turning facility on the Aiglhofkreuzung from line 4 to line 2 was created in spring 2008, as well as a dedicated lane for trolleybuses in the Griesgasse in the city centre. The latter allows the stacking-and-demand retrieval of trolleybuses in the city centre for events. With the timetable change on 7 December 2007, line 4 was extended from Langwied over the city boundary to Mayrwies, replacing bus line 4A.

In autumn 2008, the Salzburg Municipal Council decided to electrify the branch of bus line 20 to Sam / Lankessiedlung. The route follows that of line 20 from Lankessiedlung, via the Salzburg-Gnigl S-Bahn station, Fuggerstraße, Volksgarten, Hanuschplatz to the Landeskrankenhaus; the line leads back to Hanuschplatz and to Sam, via Edward-Baumgartner-Straße and Karajanplatz. This work was completed in mid-2009, and bus line 20 became trolleybus line 10.

These were the first privately financed trolleybus sections in Salzburg.

Lines 
The eleven lines of the present Salzburg trolleybus system are as follows:

Projects
In October 2010, plans for new extensions were presented. It is proposed to run line 10 through the Strubergasse in future, and thereby provide a better connection with the Struber barracks. Additionally, by means of a branch in the Karolingerstrasse, line 8 will serve the many businesses and residents in that district. The city of Salzburg plans to invest around €2.2 million in these two projects up to 2015.

For quite some time, an extension to Eugendorf, or a cross-border line to Freilassing in Germany, have also been discussed.

In December 2016, diesel bus line 20 will be converted to trolleybus line 9 with a new  route in the East of Salzburg.

Fleet

Former fleet 

Until recently, almost all of the trolleybuses operating on the Salzburg system were made either by the German company MAN or its Austrian counterpart Gräf & Stift.  After the former company took over the latter in 1971, the Gräf & Stift name remained in use as an MAN brand for the Austrian market and for trolleybuses until 2001, when ÖAF-Gräf & Stift AG was renamed MAN Sonderfahrzeuge AG.

With the retirement of large numbers of Gräf & Stift vehicles since the start of the 21st century, the MAN/Gräf & Stift portion of the fleet has been now much reduced.

Some of the retired Salzburg vehicles were sold to other trolleybus operators. By that means, former Salzburg trolleybuses later entered service on the since-closed trolleybus system in Kapfenberg, Austria, and also in Germany (Eberswalde), Lithuania (Vilnius), Romania (Mediaş and Timișoara) and Russia (Perm and Rybinsk).

Until 1975, trolleybuses also operated with trailers. Salzburg was the last trolleybus network in Austria in which this form of operation was to be found. There were four different models of trailer available.  They were made by Gräf & Stift (type OA I), Kässbohrer (without model designation), Lohner (type OM 5/1) and Schumann (without model designation).

Table of former fleet

Current fleet 

The oldest vehicles in the current fleet are the 23 high-floor Gräf & Stift articulated trolleybuses built between 1988 and 1994.  With three exceptions, they are powered by an induction motor. This series originally consisted of 36 vehicles, of which 35 were built for Salzburg.  The other one, fleet no. 220, was bought secondhand from the Kapfenberg trolleybus system.

The first low-floor trolleybuses to be added to the system were the 23 MAN articulated vehicles constructed between 1994 and 1997. One of them, fleet no. 240, is likewise a used vehicle from Kapfenberg.

The Van Hool vehicle generation, in the fleet since 2000, similarly offers only low-floor entrances.  Of the 32 Van Hool vehicles, 13 were equipped with a diesel-powered auxiliary drive, the first such devices to be fitted to vehicles in the Salzburg fleet. On 24 November 2008, two more Van Hool articulated vehicles arrived in Salzburg as secondhand acquisitions from the Vevey–Villeneuve trolleybus system, in Switzerland. These had been Vevey–Villeneuve fleet nos. 2 and 15, built in 1995.  Following renovation work, they were put back into service, with new fleet nos. 259 and 260. They were also painted, into the same dark red livery as features on the trains of the Salzburger Lokalbahn.

Of the latest Solaris Trollino 18 generation of vehicles, the first three were delivered on 14 September 2009. Eight more followed in 2010, and the remaining nine were scheduled to go into operation in 2011 and 2012. There is also an option for two further trolleybuses of this type. The new Solaris vehicles are also painted dark red and have an auxiliary drive.  In February 2010, one Solaris vehicle, fleet no. 301, was lent to the Eberswalde trolleybus system in Germany for presentation purposes.

Additionally, the procurement of a bi-articulated trolleybus is anticipated for the near future.

Table of the current fleet

Heritage fleet 

The oldest operable trolleybus in Salzburg is a 1957 model ÜHIIIs.  This is not an original Salzburg vehicle; with the fictitious number 123, it comes from the Solingen trolleybus system (former number 40) and has been loaned by an English collector.

Since July 2007, the ÜHIIIs has been operating special trips in Salzburg, for which it wears a Salzburg livery.  The vehicle can also be hired privately.  From late July to late August each year, to coincide with the Salzburg Festival, the ÜHIIIs runs on a regular basis every Friday, on a special heritage line of the Association Pro Obus Salzburg eV.  In 2012, the vehicle will return to England.

Two other serviceable heritage vehicles, also in the care of Pro Obus Salzburg eV, are the 1985-built Gräf & Stift articulated trolleybus no. 178, and the 1988-built Steyr conventional trolleybus no. 109. Both are still used in scheduled passenger service in the rush hours. This serves the dual purpose of avoiding deterioration of the heritage vehicles in storage, and better covering peak demand.

See also

List of trolleybus systems

References

Notes

Books

External links

 
 

Transport in Salzburg
Salzburg
Salzburg